East Meadow High School is a public high school in the East Meadow Union Free School District in East Meadow, New York. The school was founded in 1953 and serves students in grades 9−12.

School
As of the 2018–19 school year, the school had an enrollment of 1,446 students and 129.6 classroom teachers (on an FTE basis), for a student–teacher ratio of 11.2:1. There were 261 students (18.0% of enrollment) eligible for free lunch and 73 (5.0% of students) eligible for reduced-cost lunch.

Athletics

East Meadow offers sports programs in three seasons.

Fall sports
Football (2006 & 2011 Nassau County champions), soccer, field hockey (2008 County champions), cross country, girls' tennis, boys' golf, volleyball, cheerleading, Rockettes/kickline, girls' swimming and diving.

The girls' cross country team had a league meet winning streak from October 2000 through October 2009, with a record during this time of approximately 120–0.

Winter sports
Wrestling (1970, 1990, 1994, 2000, & 2007 Nassau County Champions), girls' basketball, bowling, winter track.

Spring sports
Baseball (1997 State champions), lacrosse, softball, track and field (2009 Boys' Class A Division I champions), girls' badminton, boys' tennis.

Notable alumni
 Criss Angel (born 1967), magician/illusionist
 Adam Busch (born 1978), actor/singer
 Richard Greenberg (born 1958), Broadway playwright
 David Wong Louie (1954–2018, class of 1973), novelist and short story writer
 Annet Mahendru (born 1985, class of 2004), actress
 John Mauceri (born 1945), conductor
 Rich Mauti (born 1954), former American football wide receiver
 Craig Mitchell (born 1964), actor/comedian/writer
 Brandon Moore (born 1979), NFL linebacker
 Rich Ohrnberger (born 1986), NFL offensive lineman.
 Dave Palumbo (born 1968), bodybuilder
 Joel Rifkin (born 1959), serial killer
 Matt Serra (born 1974), UFC fighter and former UFC Welterweight Champion
 Frank Viola (born 1960), former Major League Baseball pitcher.

References

External links
 

Public high schools in New York (state)
Educational institutions established in 1953
Schools in Nassau County, New York
1953 establishments in New York (state)